The 2004 1000 km of Monza was the first round of the 2004 Le Mans Series season, held at the Autodromo Nazionale Monza, Italy.  It was run on May 9, 2004.

Although proceeded by the 2003 1000km of Le Mans exhibition event, the 1000 km of Monza was the first official race of the new Le Mans Endurance Series.

Official results

Class winners in bold.  Cars failing to complete 70% of winner's distance marked as Not Classified (NC).

Statistics
 Pole Position - #88 Audi Sport UK Team Veloqx - 1:38.461
 Fastest Lap - #22 Zytek Engineering - 1:38.363
 Average Speed - 196.592 km/h

External links
 World Sports Racing Prototypes - 2004 1000 km of Monza results

M
6 Hours of Monza
Monza 1000